How It Was Then... Never Again is an album by British jazz trio Azimuth, whose members were vocalist Norma Winstone, pianist John Taylor, and trumpeter Kenny Wheeler. It was recorded in April 1994 at Rainbow Studio in Oslo, and was released in 1995 by ECM.

Reception

Writing for Jazz Times, Jim Ferguson stated that the group's music, "earthy yet ethereal, minimalist yet often complex–is as inventive as their instrumentation is unique." He commented: "Sublimely artful but hardly qualifying as jazz in the conventional sense, Azimuth's music is beyond categorization."

In a review for AllMusic, Scott Yanow wrote: "Taylor sometimes recalls Keith Jarrett, while Wheeler comes across as the most conventional of the three participants, and Winstone's voice keeps the music from getting too comfortable or predictable. Interesting but not essential music from three adventurous spirits."

The authors of the Penguin Guide to Jazz Recordings commented: "the music... is as progressive and empirical as anything the group has done in 20 years... Winstone's voice is as pure and reed-like as ever."

Between Sound and Space's Tyran Grillo stated: "How it was then... is a genealogy of emotions and places, a tale of winter blooms that hook their stamen onto errant sunrays and uproot themselves into weightless life. Though not as essential as earlier work, it waits all the same with bated breath and open arms."

Track listing

"How It Was Then" (Wheeler, Winstone) – 7:45
"Looking On" (Taylor, Winstone) – 5:33
"Whirlpool" (Taylor) – 4:18
"Full Circle" (Taylor) – 8:04
"How Deep Is the Ocean" (Irving Berlin) – 3:27
"Stango" (Taylor) – 4:14
"Mindiatyr" (Bobo Stenson) – 6:02
"Wintersweet" (Wheeler, Winstone) – 5:30

Personnel
Azimuth
Norma Winstone – vocals
John Taylor – piano
Kenny Wheeler – trumpet, flugelhorn

References

ECM Records albums
Azimuth (band) albums
1995 albums
Albums produced by Manfred Eicher